Amara pomona is a species of ground beetle in the family Carabidae, native to the United States.

References

Amara (genus)